S41 may refer to:

Aircraft 
 Blériot-SPAD S.41, a French fighter aircraft
 Short S.41, a British biplane floatplane
 Sikorsky S-41, an American flying boat

Rail and transit 
 S41 (Berlin), a line of the Berlin S-Bahn
 S41 (Long Island bus)
 S41 (ZVV), a line of the Zürich S-Bahn

Submarines 
 , of the Argentine Navy
 
 , of the Royal Navy
 , of the Indian Navy
 , of the United States Navy

Other uses 
 New Jersey Route 73, designated Route S41 until 1953
 S41: In case of fire and/or explosion do not breathe fumes, a safety phrase
 Sulfur-41, an isotope of sulfur
 Xhosa language
 S41, a postcode district in Chesterfield, England